A list of films produced by the Ollywood film industry and released in theaters in 2015.

List of released films

References 

Lists of 2015 films by country or language

Lists of Ollywood films by year